Fábio Nascimento de Oliveira (born 3 September 1987 in Guarulhos), known as Fábio Guarú, is a Brazilian professional footballer who plays for Monori SE in Hungary.

Club statistics

Updated to games played as of 28 September 2014.

References

 MLSZ

External links
 
 

1987 births
Living people
People from Guarulhos
Brazilian footballers
Association football defenders
Campeonato Brasileiro Série B players
Nemzeti Bajnokság I players
Clube Náutico Capibaribe players
Associação Ferroviária de Esportes players
Clube Atlético Bragantino players
Szigetszentmiklósi TK footballers
Puskás Akadémia FC players
Békéscsaba 1912 Előre footballers
FK Csíkszereda Miercurea Ciuc players
Tiszakécske FC footballers
Monori SE players
Brazilian expatriate footballers
Brazilian expatriate sportspeople in Hungary
Expatriate footballers in Hungary
Brazilian expatriate sportspeople in Romania
Expatriate footballers in Romania
Footballers from São Paulo (state)